Tizab or Tiz Ab may refer to:
 Tizab, Fars
 Tiz Ab, Kohgiluyeh and Boyer-Ahmad
 Tizab, Lorestan
 Tiz Ab, Razavi Khorasan